This is a list of the works by Nikolai Gogol (1809–1852), followed by a list of adaptations of his works: 

Drama
 Decoration of Vladimir of the Third Class, unfinished comedy (1832).
 Marriage, comedy (1835, published and premiered 1842).
 The Gamblers, comedy (1836, published 1842, premiered 1843).
 The Government Inspector, also translated as The Inspector General (1836).
 Leaving the Theater, (After the Staging of a New Comedy) (1836)

Essays
 Woman, essay (1830)
 Preface, to first volume of Evenings on a Farm (1831)
 Preface, to second volume of Evenings on a Farm (1832)
 Selected Passages from Correspondence with Friends, collection of letters and essays (1847).
 Meditations on the Divine Liturgy

Fiction
 Evenings on a Farm Near Dikanka, volume I of short story collection (1831):
 The Fair at Sorochintsï 
 St John's Eve 
 May Night, or the Drowned Maiden 
 The Lost Letter: A Tale Told by the Sexton of the N...Church
 Evenings on a Farm Near Dikanka, volume II of short story collection (1832):
 Christmas Eve 
 A Terrible Vengeance
 Ivan Fyodorovich Shponka and His Aunt
 A Bewitched Place
 Mirgorod, short story collection in two volumes (1835):
 The Old World Landowners
 Taras Bulba 
 Viy
 The Tale of How Ivan Ivanovich Quarreled with Ivan Nikiforovich
 Arabesques, short story collection (1835):
 The Portrait
 A Chapter from an Historical Novel (fragment)
 Nevsky Prospect
 The Prisoner (fragment)
 Diary of a Madman
 The Nose, short story (1835–1836)
 The Carriage, short story (1836)
 Rome, fragment (1842)
 The Overcoat (the variant of translation:  “The Overcoat of an official”), short story (1842)
 Dead Souls, novel (1842), intended as the first part of a trilogy.
  (1843)
 Nevsky Prospect
 The Portrait
 Diary of a Madman
 The Nose 
 The Overcoat

Fictional periods

Gogol's short stories composed between 1830 and 1835 are set in Ukraine, and are sometimes referenced collectively as his Ukrainian tales.

His short stories composed between 1835 and 1842 are set in Petersburg, and are sometimes referenced collectively as his St Petersburg tales.

Poetry

 Ode to Italy, poem (1829)
 Hanz Küchelgarten, narrative poem published under the pseudonym "V. Alov" (1829)

Selected compilations in English translation 

 St. John's Eve and Other Stories, trans. Isabel Florence Hapgood (Thomas Y. Crowell & Co, 1886)
 The Mantle and Other Stories, trans. Claud Field (T. Werner Laurie, 1915)
 Taras Bulba and Other Tales, trans. C. J. Hogarth (Dent, 1918)
 The Overcoat and Other Stories, trans. Constance Garnett (Chatto & Windus, 1923)
 Tales of Good and Evil, trans. David Magarshack (Lehmann, 1949). Later reprinted as The Overcoat and Other Tales of Good and Evil, with two stories added and "Taras Bulba" removed.
 The Diary of a Madman and Other Stories, trans. Andrew R. MacAndrew (New American Library, 1960)
 Collected Tales and Plays, ed. Leonard J. Kent (Pantheon, 1964). Revised editions of Garnett's translations.
 Diary of a Madman and Other Stories, trans. Ronald Wilks (Penguin, 1972)
 Plays and Petersburg Tales, trans. Christopher English (Oxford University Press, 1995)
 The Collected Tales of Nikolai Gogol, trans. Richard Pevear and Larissa Volokhonsky (Pantheon, 1998)
 And the Earth Will Sit on the Moon, trans. Oliver Ready (Pushkin Press, 2019)
 The Nose and Other Stories, trans. Susanne Fusso (Columbia University Press, 2020)

Adaptations

Film
 1913: The Night Before Christmas, a 41-minute film by Ladislas Starevich which contains some of the first combinations of stop motion animation with live action
 1926: The Overcoat, a Soviet silent film directed by Grigori Kozintsev and Leonid Trauberg
 1945: The Lost Letter, the Soviet Union's first feature-length traditionally animated film
 1949: The Inspector General, a musical comedy and very loose adaptation directed by Henry Koster and starring Danny Kaye.
 1951: The Night Before Christmas, an animated feature film directed by the Brumberg sisters
 1952: Il Cappotto, an Italian film directed by Alberto Lattuada
 1959: The Overcoat, a Soviet film directed by Aleksey Batalov
 1960: Black Sunday, an Italian horror film directed by Mario Bava and based on the Nikolai Gogol story "Viy".
 1962: Taras Bulba, a Yugoslavian/American film directed by J. Lee Thompson
 1963: The Nose, a short film by Alexandre Alexeieff and Claire Parker using pinscreen animation
 1967: Viy, a horror film made on Mosfilm and based on the Nikolai Gogol story of the same name.
 1984: Dead Souls, directed by Mikhail Shveytser
 1997: The Night Before Christmas, a 26-minute stop-motion-animated film
 2014: Viy 3D, a fantasy film
 20??: The Overcoat, an upcoming film by acclaimed animator Yuri Norstein, being worked on since 1981

Opera
 1874: Vakula the Smith, an opera by Pyotr Tchaikovsky
 1880: May Night, an opera by Nikolai Rimsky-Korsakov
 1885: Cherevichki, Tchaikovsky's revision of Vakula the Smith
 1906: Zhenitba, an unfinished opera begun in 1868 by Modest Mussorgsky
 1917: The Fair at Sorochyntsi, an unfinished opera begun in 1874 by Modest Mussorgsky and first completed by César Cui – many different versions exist
 1930: The Nose, a satirical opera by Dmitri Shostakovich
 1976: Dead Souls, an opera by Russian nationalist composer Rodion Shchedrin
 2011: Gogol, an opera by Russian composer Lera Auerbach commissioned by Vienna's Theater an der Wien

Radio
 2006: Dead Souls, a BBC radio adaptation

References

Sources
 Golub, Spencer. 1998. "Gogol, Nikolai (Vasilievich)." In The Cambridge Guide to Theatre. Ed. Martin Banham. Cambridge: Cambridge UP. 431–432. .

External links
 

 
Bibliographies by writer
Bibliographies of Russian writers
Dramatist and playwright bibliographies